Mahakavi Kunnampurathu Varghese Simon (7 February 1883 – 1944) was a 
Malayalam Christian poet from Kerala, India. He was also a musician, a teacher, a reformer, a writer, a Bible scholar and apologist. Simon authored around three hundred hymns or poems and some thirty books. K. V. Simon was given the title Mahakavi (Dean of Poets) by the Sahitya Parishad (Academy of Literature). His major work was Veda Viharam, based on the biblical Genesis. It was this work, published in 1931, that earned his name among the noted Malayalam poets. Simon was a prominent leader of the Kerala Brethren movement.

Early life
Simon was born in 1883 to Varghese, a scholar of the Hindu Puranas, and Kandama, a poet. In 1900, he married Ayroor Pandalapedika Rahelamma (later known as Ayroor Amma).  They had one daughter.

Mentored by his brother K.V. Cherian, Simon began writing poetry at the age of eight. In 1896, he became a teacher at the age of thirteen at MarThoma School, Edayaranmula.

Simon was a polyglot. He was a scholar in his native Malayalam, as well as in Sanskrit and Tamil, and also mastered English, Hindi, Telugu, Kannada, Greek, Latin, Hebrew, and Syriac.

Simon as a religious leader

Although brought up in a Christian family, Simon claimed that he did not really understand the Christian message until he listened to evangelist Tamil David in 1895. He went on to become one of the pioneers of the Kerala Brethren movement, and a leading figure in the wider Indian Brethren movement. Many prominent Christian leaders in India, both Brethren and non-Brethren, were mentored by Simon. These included Pandit M. M. John, K. E. Abraham (the founder of the India Pentecostal Church), and K. G. Kurien and K. G. Thomas.

Simon was known as a debater. In the 1920s, he took on Krishan Namboodri (who later became known as Swami Agamanda), Rishiram, and R. C. Das, who were promoting Hindutva and opposing conversion. Some of his books covered areas of Christian apologetics such as Prathiyukthi, and Satyaprakashini and Krushil Maricha Kristhu (Christ who died on the Cross), — which were compiled from notes prepared from his rebuttals to anti-Christian critics. He also wrote Satyaprakashini, an apologetics book attempting to refute Hindu critics by quoting from Hindu scriptures.

Simon also spoke out against Russian traveller Nicolas Notovitch's controversial claims that Jesus had visited India between the ages of twelve and thirty, studying under Hindu, Buddhist, and Jain teachers. Notovitch claimed to have been shown ancient literature confirming these claims when he visited Ladakh. In Krushil Maricha Kristhu (Christ who died on the Cross), Simon cited research by German scholar Max Muller, which he said exposed Notovitch's claims as a hoax.

Simon composed more than 300 songs and lyrics (many of which are still) used among Christian groups. He rendered the entire book of Genesis in poetry, and named in Malayalam language as "Vedaviharam". It  is a literary classic, and it earned him the title of Mahakavi (Dean of Poets), conferred on him by the Sahitya Parishad (Academy of Literature).

Notes

External links
 pages.prodigy.net
 K. V. Simon – History
 marthomaparishsharjah.com
 Kerala Brethren History

1883 births
1944 deaths
Indian Plymouth Brethren
Indian male poets
Malayalam poets
People from Pathanamthitta
20th-century Indian poets
Poets from Kerala
20th-century Indian male writers